Junliangcheng North railway station is a railway station of the Tianjin–Qinhuangdao high-speed railway in Dongli District, Tianjin.

Railway stations in Tianjin
Stations on the Beijing–Tianjin Intercity Railway
Stations on the Tianjin–Qinhuangdao High-Speed Railway